Andrew William Murrison (born 24 April 1961) is a British doctor, naval officer and politician. A member of the Conservative Party, he has served as the Member of Parliament (MP) for South West Wiltshire, previously Westbury, since the 2001 general election. He has been serving as Parliamentary Under-Secretary of State for Defence People, Veterans and Service Families since October 2022.

Murrison has held a variety of positions within the British government, including Minister for International Security Strategy, and Minister of State for Northern Ireland. Most recently he served as the Minister of State for International Development and the Middle East. In Parliament, he chaired the Northern Ireland Affairs Committee from July 2017 to May 2019.

Early life
The son of William Gordon Murrison RD and Marion Murrison, Murrison was born in Colchester and grew up in Harwich, Essex, where he attended the local Harwich High School (now Harwich and Dovercourt High School), and the Britannia Royal Naval College, Dartmouth.

Medical and naval career
Having been awarded a Royal Navy scholarship, Murrison qualified as a doctor from the University of Bristol's medical school in 1984. He holds the degrees of MD, MB ChB.

Until 2000, Murrison served in the Royal Navy as a medical officer based at Fareham and retired with the rank of Surgeon-Commander. During his naval career he served as an Honorary Research Registrar at Southampton General Hospital and spent one year as a postgraduate student at Hughes Hall, Cambridge, obtaining a Diploma in Public Health. From 2000, he worked as a general practitioner locum in Wiltshire and as a consultant in occupational health at Gloucestershire Royal Hospital.

In 2003, as a naval reserve officer, Murrison was recalled to serve in Iraq for a six-month tour of duty.

Political career
Before entering full-time politics, Murrison was a member of the Bow Group, an assistant to Sir Peter Lloyd (the MP for his home constituency of Fareham), and then from 1999 to 2000 an assistant to Lord Freeman, whose role at Conservative Central Office was screening potential parliamentary candidates.

In September 2000, Murrison was selected as the prospective Conservative candidate for the West Wiltshire constituency of Westbury and in June 2001 he was elected as Member of Parliament for the constituency. He was then appointed to the House of Commons Science and Technology Select Committee and was also a member of the Standing Committee on the NHS Reform Bill.

In the 2001 Conservative leadership election, Murrison supported Michael Portillo.

In November 2003, Murrison was appointed as a Shadow Minister for Health, while also taking an active interest in defence policy.

In 2004, in a free vote, he voted against the bill to ban foxhunting and hare coursing which became the Hunting Act 2004.

He was returned to Parliament at the General Election in May 2005, and was appointed as shadow defence minister.

In 2005, he spoke in parliament against European military union, saying "The threat that the proposed Euro force might pose to one of the most successful post-war organisations, NATO, and to our symbiotic relationship with the United States, has surely not been adequately explored".

In Commons divisions in 2007 on a number of House of Lords reform options, Murrison voted for options 7 and 8, proposing a 100% elected House of Lords, including the removal of all remaining hereditary peers, and against options 4 and 5, which proposed a partly elected and partly appointed upper chamber.

In the debate on a Human Embryology and Fertilisation Bill in May 2008, he supported amendments to the bill aimed at reducing the maximum gestational age for an abortion from twenty-four to twenty weeks, commenting: "The shock of the abortion list twenty-five years ago is still clear in my mind. Since then, societal attitudes have changed, in part because of improved imaging of the unborn child. I'm sure the law needs updating and twenty weeks appears to strike the right balance".

He is the Chair of the All Party Parliamentary Group on Clinical Leadership and Management, and is a member of the "Cardiac Risk in the Young All Party Parliamentary Group".

Murrison's Westbury constituency was abolished at the end of the Parliament of 2005 to 2010, but he was the Conservative party candidate for the new South West Wiltshire constituency, which includes most of his former constituency, and was elected on 6 May 2010.

Appointments since 2010

 After re-election to Parliament – appointed as PPS to the Health Secretary, Andrew Lansley owing to his experience as a physician.
 November 2011 – appointed as the Prime Minister's special representative for First World War centenary commemorations.
 September 2012 – as part of the Prime Minister's first major cabinet reshuffle, appointed as Minister for International Security Strategy in the Ministry of Defence.
 July 2014 – appointed as Parliamentary Under-Secretary of State at the Northern Ireland Office.
January 2016 – appointed Prime Ministerial Trade Envoy to Tunisia and Morocco, until his resignation on 5 July 2022.

Family
Murrison is married to Jennifer (Jenny) Munden, a physiotherapist. They have five daughters and live near Mere in Wiltshire.

Honours

 He was sworn in as a member of Her Majesty's Most Honourable Privy Council on 22 May 2019 at Buckingham Palace. This gave him the Honorific Prefix "The Right Honourable" for Life.

Publications

References

External links
Dr Andrew Murrison MP official site

Profile at the Conservative Party website
Biography at ePolitix.com for Andrew Murrison MP
Guardian Unlimited Politics – Ask Aristotle: Andrew Murrison MP

1961 births
20th-century English medical doctors
21st-century English medical doctors
Alumni of Hughes Hall, Cambridge
Alumni of the University of Bristol
Conservative Party (UK) MPs for English constituencies
Graduates of Britannia Royal Naval College
Living people
Members of the Bow Group
Members of the Privy Council of the United Kingdom
Northern Ireland Office junior ministers
People from Harwich
People from Mere, Wiltshire
Military personnel from Colchester
Royal Naval Reserve personnel
Royal Navy Medical Service officers
Royal Navy personnel of the Gulf War
Royal Navy personnel of the Iraq War
UK MPs 2001–2005
UK MPs 2005–2010
UK MPs 2010–2015
UK MPs 2015–2017
UK MPs 2017–2019
UK MPs 2019–present